Dmitry Gennadyevich Milevsky (born 28 June 1991) is a former Russian professional football player.

Club career
He made his Russian Football National League debut for FC Chernomorets Novorossiysk on 29 July 2009 in a game against FC Shinnik Yaroslavl.

See also
Football in Russia

References

External links
 
 
 Career summary at sportbox.ru

1991 births
Living people
Russian footballers
Association football midfielders
FC Chernomorets Novorossiysk players